A total solar eclipse will occur on June 16, 2178. A solar eclipse occurs when the Moon passes between Earth and the Sun, thereby totally or partly obscuring the image of the Sun for a viewer on Earth. A total solar eclipse occurs when the Moon's apparent diameter is larger than the Sun's, blocking all direct sunlight, turning day into darkness. Totality occurs in a narrow path across Earth's surface, with the partial solar eclipse visible over a surrounding region thousands of kilometres wide.

Visibility 
It will be visible at sunrise across northeastern Asia, and then crossing over North America. It will be visible as a partial eclipse over East Asia, and at sunset a partial eclipse over eastern North America.

Altai in Kazakhstan; Ust-Ilimsk, Mirny, Verkhoyansk in Russia; Dawson City,      Dawson Creek, Grande Prairie, Camrose, Ponoka, Rocky Mountain House, Medicine Hat in Canada and Sioux Falls, Pierre, Des Moines, Hannibal in the United States are the main cities in total path of the eclipse.

Saros 130

Notes

References 

 Besselian Elements - Total Solar Eclipse of 2178 June 16
 

2178 06 16
2178 06 16
2178 06 16
2170s